Noémie Elhadad is an American data scientist who is an associate professor of Biomedical Informatics at the Vagelos College of Physicians and Surgeons. As of 2022, she serves as the Chair of the Columbia University Department of Biomedical Informatics. Her research considers machine learning, natural language processing and medicine.

Early life and education 
Elhadad studied computer software engineering at École nationale supérieure d'électronique, informatique, télécommunications, mathématique et mécanique de Bordeaux (ENSEIRB). She completed her doctoral research at Columbia University. She was based in the Department of Computer Science, where she developed patient-focused text summaries of clinical literature.

Research and career 
Elhadad joined the faculty at the City College of New York. In 2007 she joined the Department of Biomedical Informatics at Columbia University. She was made Chair of the Health Analytics Center at the Columbia Data Science Institute in 2013. Her research considers how clinical data, electronic health records and patient-generated data can enhance access to information for researchers, patients and physicians. She developed an artificial intelligence tool that supported patients in the NewYork-Presbyterian Hospital. 

Elhadad is interested in using data to advance women's health. She led the Citizen Endo Project that looks to comprehensively describe how patients experience endometriosis. It was built using principles of citizen science, using patient testimonials from  focus groups in New York City and data aggregation. She created the app, Phendo, which asks patients about their experience of the disease. The name Phendo is a portmanteau of phenotyping endometriosis.

Elhadad was announced as Chair of Department of Biomedical Informatics in December 2022.

Selected publications

Personal life 
Elhadad suffers from endometriosis.

References 

Living people

Year of birth missing (living people)
Columbia University alumni
Columbia University faculty
Women data scientists